Contoocook may refer to a place name in New Hampshire, the United States:

The Contoocook River, a tributary of the Merrimack River
Contoocook, New Hampshire, a village in the town of Hopkinton, named for the river
Contoocook Railroad Bridge, oldest surviving covered railroad bridge
Contoocook Railroad Depot, restored railroad depot in Contoocook, New Hampshire
Contoocook Lake in Jaffrey and Rindge, New Hampshire, the source of the river
USS Contoocook (1864), a U.S. Navy vessel during the American Civil War